The East(ern) Slovak Lowland (Slovak: Východoslovenská nížina) is the name of a part of the Great Hungarian Plain (Slovak: Veľká dunajská kotlina) situated in Slovakia.

In terms of geomorphology, it forms one unit together with the Tisza Lowland (Tiszamenti síkság) in Hungary, the Transcarpathian Lowland (Zakarpats'ka nyzovyna) in Ukraine, and the plain Câmpia Someşului in Romania.

It consists of the following two parts:
 Eastern Slovak Hills (also translated as  Eastern Slovak Upland) in the west and the north; and
 Eastern Slovak Flat (also translated as Eastern Slovak Plain) in the middle, east and south.

References

Plains of Slovakia
Pannonian Plain